Barcinek is a village in the administrative district of Gmina Stara Kamienica, within Jelenia Góra County, Lower Silesian Voivodeship, in south-western Poland.

The village has a population of 610.

References

Barcinek